Gorka is a rural locality (a village) in Beketovskoye Rural Settlement, Vozhegodsky District, Vologda Oblast, Russia. The population was 14 as of 2002.

Geography 
The distance to Vozhega is 49 km, to Beketovskaya is 3 km. Gashkovo, Bor, Tarasovskaya, Porokhino are the nearest rural localities.

References 

Rural localities in Vozhegodsky District